The Big Bear Grizzly, the Media of the Mountain, is a local weekly newspaper serving Big Bear Lake, California, United States and surrounding communities. The Big Bear Grizzly is owned by Brehm Communications's Hi-Desert Publishing. A free version, entitled the Grizzly Weekender, is delivered to most areas of the Big Bear Valley each Saturday. The newspaper also produces a weekly shoppers guide called the Big Bear Shopper.

References

External links
 

Weekly newspapers published in California
Big Bear Lake, California
Mass media in San Bernardino County, California
1941 establishments in California
Newspapers established in 1941
Newspapers published in Greater Los Angeles